Gilman Marston (August 20, 1811July 3, 1890) was a United States representative, Senator, and United States Army general from New Hampshire.

Early life
Marston was born in Orford, New Hampshire. He graduated from Dartmouth College in 1837 and from the law department of Harvard University in 1840. He was admitted to the bar and commenced practice in Exeter, New Hampshire, in 1841 and was a member of the New Hampshire House of Representatives from 1845 to 1849. He was a delegate to the State constitutional convention of 1850.

Marston was elected as a Republican to the Thirty-sixth and Thirty-seventh Congresses (March 4, 1859 – March 3, 1863). He was a strong supporter of President Abraham Lincoln and the war effort.

Civil War
Marston served in the Union Army during the Civil War. He first saw combat as colonel of the 2nd New Hampshire Volunteer Infantry during the First Battle of Bull Run in July 1861. His arm was shattered, but he refused an amputation. After he recovered, he fought in the Peninsula Campaign, Second Battle of Bull Run, and Battle of Fredericksburg.

He was promoted to brigadier general of U.S. volunteers, effective November 29, 1862. Prior to the Chancellorsville campaign, he was relieved from duty with the Army of the Potomac and assigned to the defenses of Washington where he returned to his seat in Congress. After Gettysburg, Marston was directed to establish a prison camp in Maryland, which later became known as Point Lookout. The area was designated the District of Saint Mary's under the overall command of Maj. Gen. Benjamin Butler. In 1864, he commanded a brigade in Maj. Gen. W.F. "Baldy" Smith's XVIII Corps during the Bermuda Hundred Campaign. He took part in a disastrous assault on Cold Harbor, where his brigade suffered heavy casualties. During the Union assaults on Petersburg, Gilman assumed command of the 1st Division in the XVIII Corps on the last day of battle. Thereafter he commanded the Union troops on the north side of the James River with his headquarters located at Fort Pocahontas. Occasionally he returned to command of the 1st Division, including a brief stint during the Second Battle of Fair Oaks. Having been re-elected to Congress he resigned 1865, whereupon he received the thanks of the state of New Hampshire.

U.S. Congress
He was elected to the Thirty-ninth Congress (March 4, 1865–March 3, 1867) and in 1870 declined the Governorship of Idaho Territory. In 1872, 1873, and 1876 to 1878, he was again a member of the State house of representatives. He was an unsuccessful candidate for election in 1876 to the Forty-fifth Congress and was a delegate to the State constitutional convention of 1876.

On March 4, 1889, Marston was appointed to the U.S. Senate to fill the vacancy in the term commencing on that date and served until June 18, 1889, when a successor was elected. He died in Exeter in 1890; interment was in Exeter Cemetery.

See also
List of American Civil War generals (Union)

References
 Retrieved on 2008-02-12

External links

Grave of Gilman Marston: plaque, "stone" (both on Flickr).

1811 births
1890 deaths
Dartmouth College alumni
Harvard Law School alumni
Republican Party members of the New Hampshire House of Representatives
Union Army generals
People of New Hampshire in the American Civil War
Republican Party United States senators from New Hampshire
Republican Party members of the United States House of Representatives from New Hampshire
19th-century American politicians
People from Orford, New Hampshire